Astrothelium aeneoides is a species of corticolous (bark-dwelling), crustose lichen in the family Trypetheliaceae. It is found in Brazil, Guyana, and Puerto Rico, where it grows on the smooth bark of rainforest trees.

Taxonomy
The lichen was formally described as a new species in 2016 by Dutch lichenologist André Aptroot. The species epithet aeneoides alludes to its resemblance with Astrothelium aeneum.

Description
Its ascomata are immersed in the thallus; they are spherical, measuring 0.7–1.0  mm in diameter and arranged in groups of 2 to 5. They are contained in structures called pseudostromata (resembling a perithecium but containing both fungal tissue and substrate tissue) that have a raised surface texture distinct from that of the surrounding thallus. The ascospores, which number 8 per ascus, are hyaline, spindle-shaped (fusiform) with rounded ends, have 3 septa, and measure 20–25 by 6–9 μm. The internal chambers formed by the septa (the lumina) are diamond shaped. The use of thin-layer chromatography reveals the presence of a lichen product that the author suggests is parietin. The expected results of standard chemical spot tests are: thallus surface UV−, thallus medulla K−; pseudostroma surface UV+ (pink to orange), medulla of pseudostroma K+ (blood red).

Astrothelium aeneum is similar in morphology; A. aenoides differs by a lack of orange pigment on the thallus. Another similar species, A. aenascens, is distinguished from A. aenoides by the presence of an inspersed hamathecium. Astrothelium flavostromatum is another lookalike that is distinguished by a strongly convex and swollen (bullate) thallus and a cream-coloured pseudostromata.

References

aeneoides
Lichen species
Lichens described in 2016
Lichens of Brazil
Lichens of Guyana
Lichens of the Caribbean
Taxa named by André Aptroot